The Federal Reserve Bank of Atlanta Birmingham Branch Office is one of the five Federal Reserve Bank of Atlanta branch offices. The Birmingham branch is part of the 6th District.

The Birmingham Branch no longer conducts tours.

Current Board of Directors
The following people are on the board of directors as of 2011:

Appointed by the Federal Reserve Bank

Appointed by the board of governors

Federal Reserve Bank of Atlanta--Birmingham Branch Building on Fifth Avenue

The Federal Reserve Bank of Atlanta—Birmingham Branch building at 1801 Fifth Ave. N., in Birmingham was named to the National Register of Historic Places in 2003.

See also

 Federal Reserve Act
 Federal Reserve System
 Federal Reserve Bank
 Federal Reserve Districts
 Federal Reserve Branches
 Federal Reserve Bank of Atlanta
 Federal Reserve Bank of Atlanta Jacksonville Branch Office
 Federal Reserve Bank of Atlanta Miami Branch Office
 Federal Reserve Bank of Atlanta New Orleans Branch Office
 Federal Reserve Bank of Atlanta Nashville Branch Office

References

External links

Federal Reserve Bank of Atlanta Birmingham Branch Office
Birmingham Tour Request

Federal Reserve branches
National Register of Historic Places in Birmingham, Alabama